The Men's high jump event at the 2011 European Athletics U23 Championships was held in Ostrava, Czech Republic, at Městský stadion on 15 and 17 July.

Medalists

Results

Final
17 July 2011 / 15:05

Qualifications
Qualified: qualifying perf. 2.20 (Q) or 12 best performers (q) to the advance to the Final

Summary

Details

Group A
15 July 2011 / 10:30

Group B
15 July 2011 / 10:30

Participation
According to an unofficial count, 19 athletes from 16 countries participated in the event.

References

High jump
High jump at the European Athletics U23 Championships